Neiman is a surname. It may refer to:

Abraham Lincoln Neiman (1875–1970)
Carrie Marcus Neiman (1883–1953)
David Neiman (1921–2004), Russian-American rabbi, archaeologist, and historian
Fred Neiman (1860–1910), English ventriloquist
Joan Neiman (1920–2022), Canadian politician from Ontario
LeRoy Neiman (1921–2012), American artist
Mikhail Samoilovich Neiman (1905–1975), Soviet physicist
Nancy Neiman (born 1933), American cyclist
Richard H. Neiman (contemporary), American businessman; head of the New York State Department of Banking
Susan Neiman (born 1955), American-German moral philosopher and author
Tanya Neiman (1949–2006), American lawyer
Troy Neiman (born 1990), American baseball player
Yulia Neiman (1907–1994), Russian poet and translator

See also 
Nieman (surname)